Lalkhawpuimawia (born 22 January 1992), commonly known by his nickname Mapuia, is an Indian professional footballer who plays as a forward for Churchill Brothers in the I-League.

Career
Prior to 2017 Lalkhawpuimawia was playing football in the Mizoram semi-professional lower leagues with Chhinga Veng FC. He signed with Aizawl in January 2018. 

On 23 February 2018 Lalkhawpuimawia scored his first professional goals, a brace in a 3–0 win over Indian Arrows.

NorthEast United 
In 2020, Lalkhawpuimawia joined Indian Super League club NorthEast United on a two-year deal. Unfortunately he did not get debut for NorthEast United in 2020–21 Indian Super League season.

In 2021–22 Season he made his debut against Kerala Blasters FC on 25 November in a 0–0 draw.

Career statistics

Club

References

1992 births
Living people
Indian footballers
Aizawl FC players
Association football forwards
Footballers from Mizoram
Mizoram Premier League players
I-League players
Chhinga Veng FC players
Churchill Brothers FC Goa players
Indian Super League players
NorthEast United FC players